Nikola Savić may refer to:

Nikola Savić (politician), Serbian politician
Nikola Savić (footballer), Serbian footballer